"Sin Sin Sin" is a song by British singer Robbie Williams from his sixth studio album, Intensive Care (2005). It was released as the fourth and last single the album on 22 May 2006 by Chrysalis Records. The song was remixed for single release, being at a quicker tempo than the original. Additional hand claps were added throughout the song as well as some new instrumentation to the choruses. The song became Williams' first single not to make the top 20 on the UK Singles Chart when it peaked at number 22. Elsewhere, the single reached the top 20 in Australia and several European countries, peaking at number one in Hungary.

Music video
The video was filmed by Vaughan Arnell near Cape Town, South Africa.

Track listings
UK CD single
 "Sin Sin Sin"
 "Our Love"
 "Sin Sin Sin" (Chris Coco's on Tour mix)
 "Sin Sin Sin" (U-MYX software)

UK 7-inch single, European and Australian CD single
 "Sin Sin Sin"
 "Our Love"

UK DVD single
 "Sin Sin Sin" (video)
 "Our Love" (audio)
 "Sin Sin Sin" (Chris Coco's on Tour mix audio)
 Making of "Sin Sin Sin"
 Photo gallery

Credits and personnel
Credits are taken from the Intensive Care album booklet.

Studios
 Recorded between June 2003 and May 2005 at Air Studios, The Townhouse (London, England), Rockband East and West, and Henson Studios (Los Angeles)
 Mixed at Mix This! (Pacific Palisades, Los Angeles)
 Strings engineered at NRG (North Hollywood, California)
 Mastered at Metropolis Mastering (London, England)

Personnel

 Robbie Williams – writing, lead vocals, production
 Stephen Duffy – writing, Fender Stratocaster guitar, Martin acoustic guitar, electronic keyboards, production
 Chris Heath – writing
 Claire Worrall – backing vocals, Bösendorfer piano
 Greg Leisz – EBow guitar
 Davey Faragher – Fender Precision Bass guitar
 Jebin Bruni – Roland synthesiser
 Matt Chamberlain – drums
 David Campbell – string arrangement, conducting
 Allen Sides – string engineering
 Bob Clearmountain – mixing
 Tony Cousins – mastering

Charts

Weekly charts

Year-end charts

Release history

References

2005 songs
2006 singles
Chrysalis Records singles
Music videos directed by Vaughan Arnell
Number-one singles in Hungary
Robbie Williams songs
Songs written by Robbie Williams
Songs written by Stephen Duffy